Massachusetts House of Representatives' 1st Berkshire district in the United States is one of 160 legislative districts included in the lower house of the Massachusetts General Court. It covers part of Berkshire County. Democrat John Barrett of North Adams has represented the district since 2017.

Towns represented
The district includes the following localities:
 Adams
 Cheshire
 Clarksburg
 Florida
 Hancock
 Lanesborough
 New Ashford
 North Adams
 Williamstown

The current district geographic boundary overlaps with that of the Massachusetts Senate's Berkshire, Hampshire, Franklin and Hampden district.

Representatives
 Calvin R. Taft, circa 1858 
 William T. Filley, circa 1859 
 George H. Kearn, circa 1888 
 Henry S. Lyons, circa 1888 
 Hugh Drysdale, circa 1908
 Alton Leroy Bellows, circa 1918
 James Tracy Potter, circa 1920 
 Joseph N. Roach, circa 1923-1951 
 Roger Sala, circa 1953-1967
 Frank J. Matrango, circa 1975 
 Frank N. Costa, 1983–1987
 Daniel E. Bosley, 1987–2011
 Gailanne Cariddi, 2011 – June 2017
 John P. Barrett, III, 2017-current

See also
 Other Berkshire County districts of the Massachusetts House of Representatives: 2nd, 3rd, 4th
 List of Massachusetts House of Representatives elections
 List of Massachusetts General Courts
 List of former districts of the Massachusetts House of Representatives

Images

References

External links

 Ballotpedia
  (State House district information based on U.S. Census Bureau's American Community Survey).
 League of Women Voters of Williamstown

House
Government of Berkshire County, Massachusetts